Kyriacos Chailis (born February 23, 1978, in Famagusta) is a Cypriot football striker who recently released from Chalkanoras Idaliou.

External links
 

1978 births
Living people
Cypriot footballers
Cyprus international footballers
Association football forwards
Cypriot First Division players
Anorthosis Famagusta F.C. players
Nea Salamis Famagusta FC players
AC Omonia players
AEP Paphos FC players
Ermis Aradippou FC players